The South Caucasian gudgeon (Romanogobio macropterus) is a species of cyprinid fish found in the Kura and Aras drainages flowing to the southwest Caspian Sea from headwaters in Turkey down to lower reaches in Azerbaijan and Iran.

References

Romanogobio
Fish described in 1901